Salifou Koucka Ouiminga (born 4 April 1977) is a Burkinabé judoka who competed at the 2000 Summer Olympics.

Ouiminga competed in the half-middleweight division at the 2000 Summer Olympics, but he lost in the first round against Tsend-Ayuushiin Ochirbat from Mongolia.

References

1977 births
Living people
Olympic judoka of Burkina Faso
Judoka at the 2000 Summer Olympics
Burkinabé male judoka
21st-century Burkinabé people